Wels Airfield  is an airfield serving Wels, a city in the Austrian state of Upper Austria. It is not used for commercial scheduled services but features business and general aviation as well as private and military training flights and medical transportation.

See also

 Transport in Austria
 List of airports in Austria

References

External links
 Official website
 

Airports in Austria
Airport
Buildings and structures in Upper Austria